"World Without You" is a single by Belinda Carlisle from her 1988 album Heaven on Earth.

World Without You may also refer to:

"A World Without You" (Michelle), a song by Bad Boys Blue from their 1988 album My Blue World
"World Without You" (Beth Hart song), a song by Beth Hart from her 2003 album Leave the Light On
"World Without You" (Ivy song), a song by American indie pop band Ivy from their 2011 album All Hours
"A World Without You", a song by Belle and Sebastian from the 2022 album A Bit of Previous
"A World Without You", a song by Marty Stuart from the 2010 album Ghost Train: The Studio B Sessions

See also
"No World Without You", a song by Kylie Minogue from her 1991 album Let's Get to It